The Miss Mundo Dominicana 2008 pageant was  held on July 27, 2008. This year only 16 candidates were competing for the national crown. The chosen winner will represent the Dominican Republic at the Miss World 2008. The first runner up will represent the Dominican Republic in Miss America Latina 2009. Its national director, Belkys Reyes is a "Miss trainer" who has prepared models like Amelia Vega.

Results

Miss Mundo Dominicana 2008: Geisha Natalie Montes de Oca Robles (Distrito Nacional)
1st Runner Up: Rosaura Almánzar (Puerto Plata)
2nd Runner Up: Cinthia Bengacomo (Com. Dom. Nueva York)

Top 6

Magdalena Batista (Santiago)
Laura Bedmigton (Com. Dom. Canada)
Erica Moros (La Romana)

Top 10

Maite Cargoa (Com. Dom. Miami)
Cristina Peña (La Vega)
Sofy Arcenegas (Com. Dom. Lto. America)
Erica Peralta (Santo Domingo)

Special awards
 Miss Photogenic (voted by press reporters) - Sofy Arcenegas (Com. Dom. Lto. America)
 Miss Congeniality (voted by contestants) - Sandra Batista (Santiago)
 Best Face - Geisha Montes (Distrito Nacional)
 Best Provincial Costume - Joana Reynosa (Espaillat)
 Miss Talent - Rosaura Almánzar (Puerto Plata)
 Miss Top Model - Sofy Arcenegas (Com. Dom. Lto. America)

Miss Dominican Regions

Miss Region del Cibao: Rosaura Almánzar (Puerto Plata)
Miss Region en el Exterior: Cinthia Bengacomo (Com. Dom. Nueva York)
Miss Region del Sur: Geisha Montes (Distrito Nacional)

Delegates

Miss Dominican Republic
2008 beauty pageants
2008 in the Dominican Republic